Chris Mandia is an American playwright, screenwriter, film director, and Iraq War veteran from San Pedro, California. He was a U.S. Marine infantryman and served two combat tours in Iraq, including the battle for Fallujah. Mandia has won numerous awards for his work and received a Jack Nicholson scholarship to attend the MFA program at the University of Southern California's film school.  In 2010, he received an Operation In Their Boots fellowship and “Get Some,” a film he authored, was a Cannes Film Festival selection. In 2012 he co-wrote the multimedia physical theatre piece, Trajectories: Transformations with Meron Langsner for Evet Arts.  The piece was based on interviews with servicemen from the Iraq and Afghanistan wars and was performed in Boston and Chicago.

External links
Official website
Operation In Their Boots promo
The Academic Front

References

American film directors
Living people
American male screenwriters
USC School of Cinematic Arts alumni
Year of birth missing (living people)